Syed Asim Munir Ahmed Shah HI(M) is a Pakistani army general and the current Chief of Army Staff, prior to become army chief he was posted in GHQ as the Quartermaster general. He commanded the XXX Corps in Gujranwala from 17 June 2019 to 6 October 2021. He served as the 23rd Director-General of the ISI until he was replaced with Lt. Gen. Faiz Hameed on 16 June 2019. He is also a holder of the Sword of Honour. Prime Minister of Pakistan Shehbaz Sharif appointed him as 11th Chief of Army staff on 24 November 2022 for the term of 3 years. He is also a Hafiz-e-Quran.

Military career
Asim Munir is from the 17th course of the Officers Training School in Mangla. He was commissioned in the 23rd Battalion of the Frontier Force Regiment. He started his military career in 1986. He was promoted to the rank of Lieutenant General in September 2018 and was subsequently appointed as DG ISI. He previously served as Director General of Military Intelligence. He was awarded the Hilal-i-Imtiaz in March 2018. He had earlier served as the commander of the Troops deployed in the Northern Areas of Pakistan. In June 2019, Munir was replaced by Lt. Gen. Faiz Hameed as the new DG ISI. Munir was appointed as Corps Commander of XXX Corps in Gujranwala.

On December 8, 2022, Asim Munir received the Nishan-i-Imtiaz (Military) award from President Arif Alvi. At the Aiwan-e-Sadr, the top military officials were given special investitures in front of Prime Minister Shehbaz Sharif, diplomats, lawmakers, and federal ministers were present during the ceremony.

Dates of promotion

Awards and decorations

References

Living people
Directors General of Inter-Services Intelligence
Pakistani generals
Lieutenant generals
Recipients of Hilal-i-Imtiaz
Date of birth missing (living people)
Year of birth missing (living people)
Place of birth missing (living people)